Dave Versteeg (born 27 March 1976) is a Dutch short track speed skater. He competed in two events at the 1998 Winter Olympics.

References

1976 births
Living people
Dutch male short track speed skaters
Olympic short track speed skaters of the Netherlands
Short track speed skaters at the 1998 Winter Olympics
Sportspeople from Leiden
20th-century Dutch people